Joachim Kupke (born 21 May 1947, in Sindelfingen) is a German painter and graphic artist. Since the 1970s, he has also worked as a musician, and singer/ songwriter in the band, "If you wanted to".

Life and art 
From 1965 to 1967 Joachim Kupke attended the Art School A.L. Merz in Stuttgart. Following this, he studied at the Academy of Fine Arts in Stuttgart with Rudolf Haegele (1967–1972).

His studies at the Academy of Fine Arts in Stuttgart were followed by a prolonged period of study in the United States. There he worked on a series of photographs showing people in everyday situations. These became material for later work.

 Columbus/ Ohio, photo, 1971
 Soft Craws, pencil, tempera and opaque white on cardboard, 1972

Working since 1972 as a freelance painter and graphic artist, Kupke became a Member of the [Association of Baden-Württemberg Artists] in 1980. At this time he also produced cartoons, which were published in magazines and newspapers including Playboy, Il Mago der Stuttgarter Zeitung and Pardon. On the publication of his first cartoon strip "Horror Sapiens " in 1977 Joachim Kupke was described as "Höllenfürst der Zeichenfeder" (The Prince of Darkness of the quill). 
 Cartoon, "Horror sapiens", 1977
 Cartoon, "Geschlossene Gesellschaft", 1983

During this period Kupke produced drawings and oil paintings, which grappled with paintings and art forms in unfamiliar and unusual ways.

 Landschaft mit Seiltänzer,  Oil on Canvas, 1979/ 1980

After a series of solo and group exhibitions, in 1981 Kupke received a grant from the Arts Foundation of Baden-Württemberg. This was followed by a stipend from the city Sindelfingen in 1986.
In 1995 Joachim Kupke married Sarah Webb (born 1960 in Bedford, UK), the educationalist and actress. Sarah Kupke has lived in Sindelfingen since 1990, where she is the Head of the International School of Stuttgart, Sindelfingen Campus.

Work 
"To begin with, Joachim Kupke’s work is near to photorealism, with a penchant for ludicrous, interconnected motives, seemingly surreal and yet representing the artist’s intrinsic questioning behind the concept of "original". Also, his constant exploration into the nature of modern 20th century art itself. (...) The paradox of "original and reproduction" is part of life and art for Joachim Kupke, and prompts his playful exploration of the concept of "originality". "

 Für Kläuschen ein schöner Hintergrund von Canaletto, pencil, crayon and paper, 1982

"Joachim Kupke’s works are created in an old master, realistic painting style. They use well-known works of art history, to which the artist feels an intimate relationship; a kind of kinship. They are not ironic re-creations or new creations. Rather, they have much more to do with the authenticity in what is represented and how it has been devaluated though mass media reproduction.
Derived from our knowledge of the exponentially fragmentary nature of our perceptions and their connection with the widespread flood of pictures in all their reproduced manifestations, Kupke posits his technically brilliant commentary on art and art as art, about art.

 Pour Robert Lebel, Oil on Canvas, 2003

This is also true for the nascent years of the series "Room in Delft ". In these paintings Joachim Kupke transformed into the present, in his own inimitable way, one of the most important painters of European art, Jan Vermeer."

 Zimmer in Delft (3), Oil on Canvas, 2006
 Zimmer in Delft (Mistress and Maid), Oil on Canvas, 2006
 Zimmer in New York, Oil on Canvas, 2010
 Zimmer in Delft (Passepartout), Oil on Canvas, 2010
 Kate Moss in Delft, Oil on Canvas, 2010/2011
 Allegory of Faith (Geertruyt Soup), Oil on Canvas, 2012
 Silence of Songbirds, Oil on Canvas, 2013/2014
 Dutch Interior No 1 (corrected Banksy), Oil on Canvas, 2014/ 2015

Gallery

Solo exhibitions
 1972 "Kritischer Realismus", Galerie am Jacobsbrunnen, Stuttgart
 1974 Kunstverein Heidenheim, Galerie Akzent
 1979 Galerie Walther, Düsseldorf
 1983 Galerie der Stadt Sindelfingen
 1990 Kleine Galerie des Kulturbundes, Torgau
 1991 Galerie Zaiss, Aalen
 1991 "Bilder", Kunstkreis Spaichingen
 1994 "Rätsel des Verständlich Schönen", Galerie Burg, Leinfelden-Musberg
 1997 "Ölbilder und Peintagen", Galerie Geiger, Kornwestheim
 1999 "Ölbilder und Peintagen", Galerie Burg, Leinfelden-Musberg
 2000 "Ölbilder und Peintagen", Galerie Geiger, Konstanz
 2000 "Corrected Ready-Mades/ Peintagen", Galerie am Pfleghof, Tübingen
 2003 "Kunst.Frauen" Kunstforum Weil der Stadt, Wendelinskapelle
 2003 "Kunst.Frauen" Galerie am Pfleghof, Tübingen
 2004 "Aperto", Galerie Geiger, Konstanz
 2004 "Aperto", Galerie und Edition Zeherit, Dreisslingen-Lauffen
 2006 "Das Gesamtwerk", Galerie der Stadt Sindelfingen
 2007 "Appropriate Appropriations", neue Ölbilder und frühe Fotos, Galerie Geiger, Konstanz
 2011 "12 Künstler – 12 Wege. Ausgangspunkt Stuttgarter Kunstakademie", Galerie Schlichtenmaler Stuttgart
 2014 "Kate Moss in Delft", Malerei und Zeichnungen, Kultur- und Museumszentrum Schloss Glatt, Sulz am Neckar
 2015 "Kate Moss in Delft",  Galerie der Stadt Sindelfingen
 2015 "Kate Moss in Delft", Galerie d'art, Corbeil-Essonnes, France
 2017 "Homage to Modern Art", Galerie Schlichtenmaier, Schloss Dätzingen, Grafenau

Selected group exhibitions 
1970 "Vier junge Künstler aus Frankreich und Deutschland", Kurfürstliches Schloss Mainz
1971 "Internationaler Salon Paris Sud", Juvisy, France
1973 Museum zu Allerheiligen, Schaffhausen, Switzerland
ab 1973 Teilnahme an Jahresausstellungen des Künstlerbundes Baden- Württemberg und des Württembergischen Kunstvereins
1978 Sechzehn Künstler, Württembergischer Kunstverein Stuttgart
1979 "25 Ans d'Art en Baden-Württemberg", Palais du Rhin, Straßburg/France
1988 "2 villes 5 artistes", CAC Pablo Neruda, Corbeil-Essonnes/France
2005 "15 aus 30", 30 Jahre Galerie Geiger, Konstanz 
2006 "Figurative Bildwelten", Galerie Schlichtenmaler, Stuttgart
2007 "Gestochen scharf! Die Kunst zu reproduzieren", Zeppelin Museum, Friedrichshafen
2007 "Die Surrealität des Alltäglichen", Galerie Schlichtenmaler, Stuttgart
2013 "Das Antlitz!", Württembergischer Kunstverein Stuttgart

References

Literature 
 Kupke Imagines, bilingual Book, Introduction by Otto Pannewitz, Photos und Edition: Monika Houck, 2016, 
 Kate Moss in Delft, Text von Otto Pannewitz. Galerie der Stadt Sindelfingen, 2014, 
 Das Gesamtwerk, Text von Otto Pannewitz. Galerie der Stadt Sindelfingen, 2006 
 Aperto. Text von Stephan Geiger, Galerie Geiger, Konstanz, 2004 
 Kunst, Frauen. Text von Veronika Burger, Galerie am Pfleghof, Tübingen, 2003
 Corrected Ready-Mades. Peintagen Text von Veronika Burger, Galerie am Pfleghof, Tübingen, 2000
 Rätsel des Verständlich-Schönen. Text von Otto Pannewitz, Galerie der Stadt Sindelfingen, 1993, 
 Joachim Kupke. Text von Friedhelm Röttger und Elke Rothmund, Verlag C.F. Rees Heidenheim, 1983
 Geschlossene Gesellschaft, Texte Verlag Tübingen, 1983, 
 Horror Sapiens. Text von Ruprecht Skasa-Weiss, Texte Verlag Tübingen, 1977, 
 Gereimt ist alles möglich. Text: Braun, Günther; Illustrationen: Kupke, Joachim, Stuttgart, Deutsche Verlagsanstalt, 1974,

External links 
 
 Corbeil-Essonnes, Plaquette Culturelle 2015, p. 3 and 19
 Der Blaue Reiter, Zeitschrift für Philosophie
 www.ifyouwantedto.de

Living people
1947 births